Mark Andrew Robinson (born 29 April 1963) is an Australian politician who is a former Deputy Speaker of the Queensland Legislative Assembly. Since March 2009, he has held the seat of Oodgeroo (formerly Cleveland) in the Legislative Assembly for the Liberal National Party (LNP).

Early life and education
Robinson was born in Traralgon, Victoria. He has a PhD from the University of Queensland, a Master of Arts in International Studies from Griffith University, and a Bachelor of Science majoring in marine biology and zoology from James Cook University. He was a lecturer, teacher and charity manager before entering politics.

Member of Parliament
In 2009, he was elected to the Legislative Assembly of Queensland as the Liberal National Party member for Cleveland.

He was appointed the Shadow Parliamentary Secretary for Apprenticeships and Trade Training in November 2010. Following the election of Campbell Newman as LNP Leader, Robinson was given the position of Shadow Minister for Main Roads, Fisheries and Marine Infrastructure. Two weeks after the LNP formed government following its win in the 2012 state election, Robinson was elevated to the role of Deputy Speaker and Chairman of Committees of the Queensland Parliament, and was formally elected to the position on 17 May 2012. At the 2017 redistribution the state seat was renamed Oodgeroo. He now serves as a member of the Parliamentary Crime and Corruption Committee (PCCC) in the Parliament.

He stood for the LNP leadership after the 2017 election finishing third behind Deb Frecklington and John-Paul Langbroek.

Personal life
Mark is married to Julie Robinson and lives in Redland City; they have 7 children together.

Policies and views
The Guardian has referred to Robinson as "ultra-conservative". Labor MP Jackie Trad once referred to him as an "extremist".

Abortion
Robinson has been an outspoken critic of abortion, and has stated he believes life is sacred. He said he once believed that abortion was a personal and medical choice, but his views have since changed. As an MP, he attended multiple anti-abortion rallies including one in Melbourne, Victoria, with his wife, for which he charged taxpayers his travel expenses.

He opposed a 2018 law to decriminalise abortion in Queensland (previously, Queensland was the last remaining jurisdiction in Australia where performing an abortion was a crime) and allow abortion on request up to 22 weeks, as well as introduce safe access zones of 150 metres around clinics. He referred to the Australian Labor Party as "the abortion party" and Jackie Trad (then-Deputy Premier) as "Jihad Jackie", suggesting she was "on a jihad to force extreme abortion laws on QLDers".

Religion and ethnicity
The Brisbane Times described Robinson as a conservative Christian while LNP MP Shane Knuth described him as a born-again Christian.
In 2015 Robinson accused Australian politicians of "muspandering" (pandering to Muslims) and US politicians of "hispandering" (pandering to Hispanic Americans).

Family values, LGBT people and education
In a press release on 12 May 2020, Robinson stated that parents are "sick" of "Labor's politically correct extremist social engineering" through "compulsory gender fluid programs in schools" and he is proud the LNP pledged to scrap "transgender studies" and "get the curriculum back to basics".

He has expressed support for "mainstream values" and "traditional family values".

During the debate about legalising same-sex marriage in Australia in 2017, Mark Robinson's wife, Julie Robinson, posted an anti-SSM sign on Labor MP Don Brown's office window. Brown asked for an apology. Mark defended his wife, and accused Don of having a "fragile ego". Julie eventually apologised.

References

External links
Mark Robinson MP

1963 births
Living people
Members of the Queensland Legislative Assembly
Liberal National Party of Queensland politicians
People from Traralgon
James Cook University alumni
University of Queensland alumni
Griffith University alumni
21st-century Australian politicians
20th-century Australian people